Graeme Holmes (born 26 March 1984 in Motherwell) is a Scottish footballer who plays as a midfielder for Cumbernauld Colts.

Career
Holmes began his career with Dundee United but made only four appearances (three in the league), all as substitute. A loan spell at Dumbarton for the first part of the 2004–05 season brought him twelve games, but he played no further matches on his return to Tannadice and was released in September 2005. Two months later, he signed for Airdrie Utd.

In May 2008, Holmes left Airdrie to join Scottish First Division side Dunfermline Athletic joining up with manager Jim McIntyre, whom he played with while at Dundee United.

Unfortunately injury affected his time at the Pars and he was released at the end of the 2009–10 season, moving on to Greenock Morton, where his father Jim Holmes is considered a legend.

Holmes was released in May 2011, after one season at Morton. Within a month, Holmes had signed for relegated Alloa Athletic in the Scottish Football League Third Division. Holmes spent six years with Alloa, before signing for fellow Scottish League One side Albion Rovers on 2 June 2017.

Holmes signed for Lowland League team East Kilbride after his spell with Albion Rovers before moving to Edinburgh City in January 2020.

Personal life
Graeme's father, Jimmy Holmes was also a footballer who played professionally for Partick Thistle, Morton, Falkirk, Alloa and Arbroath.

Career statistics

A.  The "Other" column constitutes appearances (including substitutes) and goals in the Scottish Challenge Cup, 2006–07 Scottish First Division play-offs, 2007–08 Scottish First Division play-offs & 2012–13 Scottish First Division play-offs.

Honours
Scottish Third Division: 2011–12

References

External links

1984 births
Living people
Footballers from Motherwell
Dundee United F.C. players
Dumbarton F.C. players
Airdrieonians F.C. players
Dunfermline Athletic F.C. players
Greenock Morton F.C. players
Alloa Athletic F.C. players
Albion Rovers F.C. players
Scottish footballers
Scottish Premier League players
Scottish Football League players
Scottish Professional Football League players
Association football midfielders
East Kilbride F.C. players
F.C. Edinburgh players
Cumbernauld Colts F.C. players
Forfar Athletic F.C. players
Lowland Football League players